The 2002 Copa de la Reina de Fútbol was the 20th edition of the main Spanish women's football cup. Levante won its third title.

Bracket

References

External links
Results at Txapeldunak.com

Copa de la Reina
Women
2002